The enzyme Lrhamnonate dehydratase catalyzes the chemical reaction

L-rhamnonate  2-dehydro-3-deoxy-L-rhamnonate + H2O

This enzyme belongs to the family of lyases, specifically the hydro-lyases, which cleave carbon-oxygen bonds. The systematic name of this enzyme class is L-rhamnonate hydro-lyase (2-dehydro-3-deoxy-L-rhamnonate-forming). This enzyme is also called Lrhamnonate hydro-lyase. This enzyme participates in fructose and mannose metabolism.

Structural studies

References

 

EC 4.2.1
Enzymes of known structure